Ray's Male Heterosexual Dance Hall is a 1987 American short comedy film directed by Bryan Gordon. At the 60th Academy Awards, held in 1988, it won an Oscar for Best Short Subject.

Cast

 John Achorn as George Scurry
 Tim Choate as Phil Leeds
 Joe D'Angerio as John Garber
 Boyd Gaines as Sam Logan
 Darryl Henriques as Stuart Gaul
 Tommy Hinkley as Andrew Northfield
 Matt Landers as Ray Pindally
 Jay McCormack as Dick 'Tango Man' Dietz
 Sam McMurray as Peter Harriman
 Steven Memel as Disc Jockey
 David Rasche as Cal McGinnis
 Kevin Scannell as Ben Trelborne
 Ed Scheibner as Bartender
 Peter Van Norden as Ed Granger
 Lyman Ward as Dick Tratten
 Lee Wilkof as Malcolm Stennis
 Fred Willard as Tom Osborne
 Kent Williams as Steve Cook
 Robert Wuhl as Benny Berbel

References

External links

1987 films
1987 short films
1987 comedy films
American independent films
American comedy short films
Live Action Short Film Academy Award winners
Films directed by Bryan Gordon
1980s English-language films
1980s American films